Carbine Studios was a video game developer and subsidiary of NCSOFT, founded in 2005 by former members of Blizzard Entertainment. They were the developers of the online role-playing game WildStar.

History
Carbine's founders were 17 former members of Blizzard Entertainment's World of Warcraft development team. Since then they have employed key personnel from games such as Diablo II, StarCraft, Metroid Prime, Fallout, EverQuest, City of Heroes, Half-Life 2 and many from other titles. The company was acquired by NCSOFT in 2007.

In March 2016, NCSOFT announced a reorganization and Polygon says more than 70 Carbine employees were laid off; this is about 40% of the studio. The studio will still focus on Wildstar development for its players, but the studio cancelled the planned Chinese version of the game.

In April, 2017, job postings hiring for an unannounced title were added to the Carbine website. These mentioned use of Unreal Engine, and for applicants who have experience with "AAA cooperative multiplayer experience, multiplayer action combat titles."

On September 6, 2018, NCSoft announced that Carbine Studios would be closed immediately and WildStar would 'begin the process of winding down'.

Game
WildStar, a science fantasy MMORPG was the first and last game released by Carbine Studios in June 2014. The game, while it achieved initial success, dwindled over the next 4 years. The initial release model of subscription-based access to the game was abandoned and restructured into a Free to Play model with in-game microtransactions available. Wildstar was announced to be closed on November 28, 2018 via the game's website and the official Steam Forums.

References

External links
Carbine Studios
WildStar, official website
NCSOFT Corporation

Companies based in Aliso Viejo, California
Defunct video game companies of the United States
Video game development companies
Video game companies established in 2005
Video game companies disestablished in 2018
Defunct companies based in Greater Los Angeles
NCSoft
2007 mergers and acquisitions
American subsidiaries of foreign companies